Hydrogenovibrio crunogenus (basonym Thiomicrospira crunogena)  is a colorless, sulfur-oxidizing bacterium first isolated from a deep-sea hydrothermal vent. It is an obligate chemolithoautotrophic sulfur oxidizer and differs from other species of this genus by its DNA base composition and by its growth rate and optimal pH in thiosulfate medium. ATCC 35932T (=LMD 84.00T) is the type strain of the species. It was originally published in the genus Thiomicrospira as Thiomicrospira crunogena but was reclassified to the genus Hydrogenovibrio in 2017, resulting a grammatical gender change of the specific epithet from crunogena to crunogenus. The genome sequence of H. crunogenus XCL-2 has been published but that of the type strain has not yet been undertaken.

References

Further reading

Menning, Kristy Jae. Dissolved Inorganic Carbon Uptake in Thiomicrospira crunogena XCL–2 is ATP–sensitive and Enhances RubisCO–mediated Carbon Fixation. Diss. University of South Florida, 2012.

External links
LPSN

Type strain of Thiomicrospira crunogena at BacDive -  the Bacterial Diversity Metadatabase

Thiotrichales